Varvara (Cyrillic: Варвара; , Varvára), a variant of "Barbara", may refer to:

Places
Varvara, Azerbaijan
 Varvara, Prozor, on the Rama river, Bosnia and Herzegovina
 Varvara, Burgas Province, Bulgaria
 Varvara, Pazardzhik Province, Septemvri Municipality, Bulgaria
 Varvara, Chalkidiki, Greece
 Varvara, Tearce, Tearce Municipality, Republic of North Macedonia

Books
Varvara, US title of 1956 novel Sea of Glass by Dennis Parry

People
 Varvara (singer)
Varvara Annenkova (1795–1866), Russian poet
Varvara Bakhmeteva, Mikhail Lermontov's muse
Varvara Baruzdina (1862–1941), Russian painter
Varvara Barysheva (born 1977), Russian speed skater
Varvara Bubnova (1886–1983), Russian painter and pedagogue
Varvara Flink, Russian tennis player 
Varvara Golitsyna ( Engelhardt (1752–1815), Russian lady in waiting and noble
Varvara Ivanova (born 1987), Russian virtuoso harpist
Varvara Lepchenko (born 1986), former Uzbekistan and now American tennis player
Varvara Massalitinova (1878–1945), Russian theatre and film actress
Varvara Mestnikova, Russian chess player 
Varvara Rudneva (1844–1899), first Russian women physician
Varvara Saulina, Russian chess player 
Varvara Stepanova (1894–1958), Russian artist
Varvara Subbotina, Russian synchronized swimmer 
Varvara Yakovleva (died 1918), Russian Orthodox saint
Varvara Yakovleva (politician) (1884–1941 or 1944), Russian politician
Varvara Zelenskaya (born 1972), Russian alpine skier
Varvara Zubova, Russian gymnast 

Russian feminine given names